The Men's Boxing Tournament at the 2007 Pan American Games was held in Rio de Janeiro, Brazil from July 20 to July 28. There were three qualifying events for the Boxing Tournament, with the first one held in Barquisimeto, Venezuela from February 2 to February 8, 2007.

Light Flyweight (– 48 kg)

Flyweight (– 51 kg)

Bantamweight (– 54 kg)

See also
 Pan American Games Qualifier 2 in Buenos Aires, Argentina from March 15 to March 20, 2007
 Pan American Games Qualifier 3 in Port of Spain, Trinidad from April 23 to April 28, 2007

References
Results

P
2007 in Venezuelan sport
Events at the 2007 Pan American Games